The second season of The Hills was broadcast between January 15 and  April 2, 2007. The season continues to follow the lives of Lauren Conrad, Heidi Montag, Audrina Patridge and Whitney Port in Los Angeles as they face new challenges at work and school, with romances threatening to damage their friendships. The season was filmed from August 2006 through February 2007.

Synopsis
Lauren makes a decision on her relationship with Jason, and begins to focus all of her energy at work where she found herself "teamed up" with Whitney against the New York intern, Emily Weiss, who occasionally visits the Los Angeles offices. Whitney gets a job opportunity of lifetime.  Meanwhile, After being spotted with Spencer Pratt, Heidi soon learned that Spencer was being unfaithful and declared their relationship to be over. Despite this, the two eventually got back together and Lauren subsequently turned to Audrina for friendship.

Cast

Episodes

References

External links
Season 2 on MTV

2
2007 American television seasons